Moutarde van Sonansee  is a 1959 Dutch comedy film directed by Toon Hermans.

Cast
Gerard Doting	as	Notaris, [probably someone not as important as Dineke Poster playing Girl in Background]
Henk Haye	as	Boekhouder
Toon Hermans	as	Jeep Moutarde
Phyllis Lane as	Dr. Helen Ford
Linda Op 't Eynde	as	Lilly
Johan te Slaa	as	Worstfabrikant
Swen Smeele	as	Meneer Plu
Mary van den Berg	as	Juffrouw Duif
Jan van der Horst	as	Pastoor
Kees Verkade	as	Vriend van Lilly
Dineke Poster as Girl in Background
Lia van Kemenade as Other Girl in Background

External links 
 

1959 films
Dutch black-and-white films
1959 comedy films
Dutch comedy films
1950s Dutch-language films